The 1993 Nevada Wolf Pack football team represented the University of Nevada, Reno during the 1993 NCAA Division I-A football season. Nevada competed as a member of the Big West Conference (BWC). The Wolf Pack were led by Jeff Horton in his first and only year as head coach and played their home games at Mackay Stadium.

Schedule

References

Nevada
Nevada Wolf Pack football seasons
Nevada Wolf Pack football